The 2017 Ladies Tour of Norway is the fifth edition of the Ladies Tour of Norway, a women's cycling stage race in Norway and part of the 2017 UCI Women's World Tour.

Stages

Prologue
17 August 2017 – Halden to Halden,

Stage 1
18 August 2017 – Halden to Mysen,

Stage 2
19 August 2017 – Sarpsborg to Fredrikstad,

Stage 3
20 August 2017 – Svinesund to Halden,

Classification progress

References

Women's road bicycle races
2017 in women's road cycling
2017 in Norwegian sport